Martyr (Shahid) in Nepal is a term for some one who is  while making contributions for the welfare of the country or society. The term was originally used for individuals who died while opposing the Rana Regime which was in place in the Kingdom of Nepal from 1846 until 1951. 

Lakhan Thapa is regarded as the first martyr of Nepal.

List of martyrs
Rebelled against Juddha Shamsher Jung Bahadur Rana:
4 Martyrs martyred in 1941 — represented in the Shahid Gate:
Shukraraj Shastri
Dharma Bhakta Mathema
Dashrath Chand
Ganga Lal Shrestha
also
Bhimdatta Panta
Durgananda Jha
Ratna Kumar Bantawa
Yagya Bahadur Thapa
Tanka Prasad Acharya was sentenced to death, but not executed because he was a Brahmin, and was often called a "living martyr"
Colonel Amar Bikram Shah, son of Prime Minister Chautariya Puskhar Shah was sentenced to death in Teku by the Rana Regime for his role in the attempted coup de ta in 1882. He led a posse to kill the then Prime Minister Ranodip Singh Kunwar.

Legacy
Martyr's day is celebrated every year on Magh 16 (January 30). Martyr's week is Magh 10-16 (January 23–29).
Sukraraaj Tropical and Infectious Disease Hospital, named after Shukraraj Shastri,
Shahid Gate is a monument to the martyrs in Kathmandu. It is customary for Prime Ministers and other officials to visit the monument after taking oaths of office.
Martyr's Memorial A-Division League is the top division of the All Nepal Football Association.
Dashrath Stadium, Nepal's national stadium, is named after Dashrath Chand.
Many streets and parks in the country are named after the martyrs.

References

Nepalr
Lists of Nepalese people
Nepal history-related lists
Resistance movements